ST. ALi is a privately owned group of cafes, retailers and specialty coffee roaster founded and based in Melbourne, Australia in 2005. As of October 2009 ST. ALi had cafes in Melbourne, and was credited with being a contributor to the third wave of coffee movement in Melbourne.

History
ST. ALi's South Melbourne cafe was founded in 2005 by Mark Dundon. It was bought by Salvatore Malatesta in 2008. A second cafe opened in December 2012.

From January - September 2014 ST. ALi operated a pop-up location on Collins Street, Melbourne alongside other restaurants.

In February 2014, ST. ALi set up a pop up cafe and coffee masterclasses at Coffee Workers in Seoul, Korea. Also that year, ST. ALi ran a pop up cafe at the London Coffee Festival. This was followed by a cafe installation in Milan at the design festival Ventura Lambrate as part of an Australian design contingent called ‘The Other Hemisphere'.

ST. ALi established a pop up cafe in Jakarta, Indonesia in September 2014. A permanent Jakarta location was opened in 2015.

In November 2016 ST. ALi purchased North Melbourne cafe auction rooms from its founder Andrew Kelly.

In January 2022 ST. ALi offered two free rapid antigen tests for COVID-19 with orders over $159.99 as part of a promotional offer during shortages of the tests in Melbourne. The company apologised after backlash.

Philosophy and sourcing
ST. ALi coffee beans are sourced through direct trade with the coffee growers themselves. ST. ALi's coffee beans are all purchased green, and small batch roasted in Melbourne using Brambati roasters.

As well as engaging in direct trade coffee sourcing, ST. ALi is a supporter of local and community initiatives, including a barista challenge run in conjunction with Melbourne City Mission, to teach disadvantaged youth work experience and barista training.

Recognition
ST. ALi has been nationally and internationally recognised for the quality of its coffee and locally for its food. ST. ALi South was awarded "Best Food Cafe" in Melbourne in 2013 by The Age Good Cafe Guide.

ST. ALi's head of coffee, Matthew Perger, won first place at the 2012 World Brewers Cup, and has won two Australasian Specialty Coffee Association (AASCA) Detpak Australian Barista Championship titles, and also placed third at the 2011 World Barista Championship that took place in Colombia and the second place in 2013 World Barista Championship.

References

Companies based in Melbourne